Scandar Copti (born 1975) is an Israeli filmmaker, film writer, actor and producer who brings social problem of the  Arab society in Israel through video works.

Scandar defines himself as Palestinian.

Biography 
Scandar Copti (or Cobti) is a Palestinian filmmaker born 1975 in Jaffa, Tel Aviv, Israel and raised in Jaffa.

His mother, Mary, is an educator and school principal of the Arab - Jaffa democracy school, and his father, Ilya, is a carpenter. Copti received his B.Sc from the Faculty of Mechanical Engineering at the Technion. He studied acting and directing at the Technion theater, played (in Arabic) in End - End directed by Ouriel Zohar in 2001 at the Technion and the festival in Jerusalem. Formerly a mechanical engineer, he has also written, directed and edited several fiction, documentary and experimental short films. Copti lives with his family in Abu Dhabi, teaches film at a local extension of New York University, and makes films and art.

Copti filmed a video piece, called The Truth, with Rabih Boukhari in 2003.

Two Palestinians from Jaffa visit non-touristy sites in the city, recounting the “history” of the place as if they were tour guides presents a series of contradictory dialogues between two men about fictitious stories surrounding several sites in which they become sacred sites. Copti used the ability tension between ability to speak and create a historical narrative as the pinpoint of this video piece.  Copti and Boukhari raised questions about the here and now, the past, and the rewriting of the words so as to enable us to live with the sixty years, expropriated time, and one. According to Tal Ben Zvi, this video work brings up the issue of memory, remembrance and forgetting, in Palestinian culture in general, and in the city of Jaffa in particular but ironically this is not generate a meaningful, representative Palestinian national narrative.

The difficulties for Palestinians who are Israeli Arabs and make films with Israeli funding were clearly revealed when Copti directed His first full-length feature film Ajami (2009) with Israeli filmmaker Yaron Shani which nominated for an Oscar win the Ophir Award in Israel, the Caméra d'Or Special Mention at the Cannes Film Festival. His film was also nominated for the 82nd Academy Awards in the Best Foreign Film category and has won more than 15 awards worldwide.

Ajami is a story of an Arab ghetto in the city of Jaffa where violence and hatred are a daily reality. The basis of the film was to capture the reaction to state oppression and the sense of the impossibility of justice by looking at how the criminal element becomes a role model for the young men of Jaffa. 

At the interview with Channel 2, Copti said "The film does not represent Israel because ‘I cannot represent the State of Israel, I can not represent a country that does not represent me." Copti said, he concerns that the fact they brought more 200,000 people to cinema is the real achievement more than won the Oscar, due to he wanted to open people’s eyes about the reality of Arabs in Israel territory through the film. Also he added, Not only because of this, I have a problem representing Israel, the problem is that not only is there no willingness to deal with the issues, but people very quickly prefer simply to negate the other side.”

However, from another side of perspective, Israeli, has different opinion toward what Copti said. The co-director Shani said, “It’s an Israeli film, it represents, it speaks ‘Israeli’ and deals with Israeli-related problems.”

Also, Limor Livnat, Minister of Sports and Culture stated 

According to David Sarange, Ajami is representation of the artistic freedom of Israel which is key important to all Israeli cultural creativity. Moreover, not-like what Copti proclaimed to Channel 2 camera, Copti may not represent Israel, but his film did indeed.

In May, 2018, Copti ran a patent company, CoptiCo in Beit Hagefen Gallery, Haifa, Israel for three months. The company manufactures, and markets smart products designed to solve global social and cultural problems, especially Palestinian society.

According to the website, “The mission of CoptiCo is to cope with the major issues that are on the agenda of Arab societies and to foster research and development in the fields of peace, coexistence, gender inequality, and social solidarity.”

Filmography

Director 
1.2018 Affix (Video Short)

2.2018 CoptiCo (Video Short / product project of CoptiCo)

3.2018 iAshgar (Video Short / product project of CoptiCo)

4.2018 Shishette (Video Short / product project of CoptiCo)

5.2018 Jonnie Mashi (Music Video for Tamer Nafar)

6.2015 Dam: Who are you (Music Video)

7.2009 Ajami

8.2008 CFJ1 (Documentary short)

9.2003 The Truth (Video short)

Writer 
1.2018 Affix (Video Short)

2.2018 CoptiCo (Video Short / product project of CoptiCo)

3.2018 iAshgar (Video Short / product project of CoptiCo)

4.2018 Shishette (Video Short / product project of CoptiCo)

5.2018 Jonnie Mashi (Music Video) (Original Idea)

6.2015 Dam: Who are you (Music Video) (Screenplay)

7.2009 Ajami (Writer)

8.2003 The Truth (Video short) (Writer)

Actor 
1.2016 Fair Trade (Short)

2.2013 The Buried Alive Videos (Short)

3.2009 Ajami

4.2006 Shalosh Ima’ot

Producer 
1.2018 Affix (Video Short)

2.2018 CoptiCo (Video Short / product project of CoptiCo)

3.2018 iAshgar (Video Short / product project of CoptiCo)

4.2018 Shishette (Video Short / product project of CoptiCo)

5.2009 Ajami (Writer)

6.2003 The Truth (Video short) (Writer)

References

External links
 

1975 births
Living people
Film people from Tel Aviv
Palestinian film directors
Arab-Israeli film directors
Israeli film directors
People from Jaffa